Adriaen Pietersz Crabeth (1510 —1553) was a Dutch Renaissance glass painter.

Life 
Crabeth was born in Gouda.  According to Karel van Mander he had been the pupil of the glass painter Jan Swart van Groningen. He took his name from his father "Krepel Pieter" (English: "Cripple Peter"), and though he was a good student who quickly outshone his master, he died young in Autun after being there a short while during a tour of France.

According to the RKD he was the son of Pieter Dirksz Crabeth, and the brother of the Gouda glass painters Wouter and Dirk Crabeth. He became a pupil of Jan Swart of Groningen, but died relatively young, at Autun.

References

Adriaen Pietersz. Crabeth drawing on Rijksmuseum website

1510 births
1553 deaths
Dutch Renaissance painters
People from Gouda, South Holland
Sibling artists